Azania is a name that has been applied to various parts of southeastern tropical Africa. In the Roman period and perhaps earlier, the toponym has been hypothesised to have referred to a portion of the Southeast Africa coast extending from northern Kenya to the border between Mozambique and South Africa. If this is correct, then during classical antiquity Azania was mostly inhabited by Southern Cushitic peoples, whose groups would rule the area until the great Bantu Migration.

Ancient Azania
Azania was a region in ancient Arcadia, which was according to Pausanias named after the mythical king Azan. According to Herodotus, the region contained the ancient town of Paus. The use of this name coincides with a reference in which Pliny the Elder mentions an "Azanian Sea" (N.H. 6.34) that began around the emporium of Adulis and stretched around the south coast of Africa. It may well be that the Greek usage resonated with a term already in use around the Horn of Africa especially in the light of the fact that the term with a different meaning to the Greek Arcadian meaning, was in use in South Asia, Southeast Asia and China. The Greek Travelogue is unlikely to reflect navigation of the African East Coast.
The 1st century AD Greek travelogue the Periplus of the Erythraean Sea first describes Azania based on its author's intimate knowledge of the area. According to the Periplus, traded items included awls, knives, glass, and iron implements, although it is necessary to note that this does not suggest the "Azanians" were unaware of iron smelting. Chapter 15 of the Periplus suggests that Azania could be the littoral area south of present-day Somalia (the "Lesser and Greater Bluffs", the "Lesser and Greater Strands", and the "Seven Courses"). Chapter sixteen describes the emporium of Rhapta, located south of the Puralean Islands at the end of the Seven Courses of Azania, as the "southernmost market of Azania". The Periplus does not mention any dark-skinned "Ethiopians" among the area's inhabitants. They only later appear in Ptolemy's Geographia, but in a region far south, around the "Bantu nucleus" of northern Mozambique. According to John Donnelly Fage, these early Greek documents altogether suggest that the original inhabitants of the Azania coast, the "Azanians", were of the same ancestral stock as the Afro-Asiatic populations to the north of them along the Red Sea. The "Azanians" made extensive use of small sewn boats, which were used to fish and hunt. The Periplus'''s description of the "Azanians" is brief, merely characterizing them as "Dark-skinned" and "Of great stature". Subsequently, by the 10th century AD, these original "Azanians" had been replaced by early waves of Bantu settlers.

Later Western writers who mention Azania include Claudius Ptolemy (c. 100 – c. 170 CE) and Cosmas Indicopleustes (6th century CE).

Revival
The term was briefly revived in the second half of the 20th century as the appellation given to South Africa by marxists such as the Pan Africanist Congress of Azania (PAC) party. It was also considered as a possible name for South Sudan when it voted for independence in 2011, and has been applied to Jubbaland within Somalia.

Zanj Coast
Mofarite, Hadramite and Omani merchants established various trading posts on the Zanj Coast corresponding to Azania: the South Semitic etymology of A'Zania preceded the later Arabic Al-Zanjia. The roots of "land of the Zanj" - "Al-Zanjia" however is contested as not being related to the South Semitic etymology, nor to the Greek usage referring to an Arcadian territory and legend - and pronounced differently "e osania", but rather relates to Southeast Asia etymology. Zanj in Arabic means the "land of the blacks (slaves)". Zanj in Arabic means the "country of the blacks". Other transliteration include Zenj, Zinj, and Zang.. Anthony Christie argued that the word zanj or zang may not be Arabic in origin: a Chinese form (僧祇 sēngqí) is recorded as early as 607 AD. Christie argued that the word is South East Asian in origin. The Javanese word  means African people, precisely the people of Zanzibar. It is known that the Indonesian Austronesian peoples reached Madagascar by ca. 50–500 CE. As for their route, one possibility is that the Indonesian Austronesian came directly across the Indian Ocean from Java to Madagascar. It is likely that they went through the Maldives where evidence of old Indonesian boat design and fishing technology persists until the present.

See also
Menouthias
Rhapta
Zanj Coast

References

Bibliography
Casson, Lionel (1989). The Periplus Maris Erythraei. Lionel Casson. (Translation by H. Frisk, 1927, with updates and improvements and detailed notes). Princeton, Princeton University Press.
Chami, F. A. (1999). "The Early Iron Age on Mafia island and its relationship with the mainland." Azania Vol. XXXIV 1999, pp. 1–10.
Chami, Felix A. 2002. "The Egypto-Graeco-Romans and Paanchea/Azania: sailing in the Erythraean Sea." From: Red Sea Trade and Travel. The British Museum. Sunday 6 October 2002. Organised by The Society for Arabian Studies.[www.thebritishmuseum.ac.uk/ane/fullpapers.doc]

Huntingford, G.W.B. (trans. & ed.). Periplus of the Erythraean Sea. Hakluyt Society. London, 1980.
Yu Huan, The Weilue in The Peoples of the West'', translation by John E. Hill

External links

 Electronic Antiquity Journal: Communicating the Classics, Vol 1 no 5, research by John Hilton at the University of Natal, Durban.
 Azania, Journal of the British Institute in Eastern Africa

Names of places in Africa
History of Kenya
Precolonial Tanzania
Regions of Somalia
Ancient Greek geography of East Africa